The geographically small island nation of Singapore has few rivers of significant length or width. The longest of these, the Kallang River, is only 10 km in length. The Singapore River, perhaps the most famous in the country, is of a short length as well. However, the country's tropical climate and heavy rainfall require a very comprehensive network of natural draining systems, much of which has become a concrete system as urbanisation spread across the island.

Natural rivers

On offshore islands

Pulau Tekong
 Sungei Belang
 Sungei Chek Mat Nah
 Sungei Pasir
 Sungei Permatang
 Sungei Sanyongkong
 Sungei Seminei
 Sungei Unum

Pulau Ubin
 Sungei Asam
 Sungei Batu Kekek
 Sungei Besar
 Sungei Jelutong
 Sungei Mamam
 Sungei Puaka
 Sungei Pulau Ubin
 Sungei Teris
 Sungei Tiga
 Sungei Wat Siam

Former rivers

Dammed and flooded
 Sungei Chik Abu - flooded and part of Lower Seletar Reservoir
 Sungei Puaka - flooded and part of Lower Seletar Reservoir
 Sungei Kranji - now the Kranji Reservoir
 Sungei Murai - now the Murai Reservoir
 Sungei Poyan - now the Poyan Reservoir
 Sungei Sarimbun - now the Sarimbun Reservoir
 Sungei Sopok - flooded and part of Lower Seletar Reservoir
 Sungei Tengeh - now the Tengeh Reservoir

References 

Singapore
Rivers of Singapore